Stanley Fube is an Anglican bishop in Nigeria: he is the current Bishop of Langtang, one of ten dioceses within the Anglican Province of Jos, itself one of 14 provinces within the Church of Nigeria.

Notes

Living people
Anglican bishops of Langtang
21st-century Anglican bishops in Nigeria
Year of birth missing (living people)